Ponsonby Tottenham (1746 – 13 December 1818) was an Anglo-Irish politician.

Tottenham sat in the Irish House of Commons as the Member of Parliament for Fethard between 1779 and 1790, before sitting for Bannow from 1790 and 1797. He then represented Clonmines between 1797 and the seat's disfranchisement under the Acts of Union 1800. In 1800 he had been appointed Clerk of the Ordnance in the Irish Board of Ordnance and was awarded compensation of £487 2s. 6d per annum following the abolition of the post after the Union. Tottenham subsequently sat in the House of Commons of the United Kingdom as the MP for Wexford Borough from 1801 to 1802, before representing New Ross between 1805 and 1806.

References

1746 births
1818 deaths
18th-century Anglo-Irish people
19th-century Anglo-Irish people
Irish MPs 1776–1783
Irish MPs 1783–1790
Irish MPs 1790–1797
Irish MPs 1798–1800
Members of the Parliament of Ireland (pre-1801) for County Wexford constituencies
Members of the Parliament of the United Kingdom for County Wexford constituencies (1801–1922)
UK MPs 1801–1802
UK MPs 1802–1806